Miroslav Svoboda (born 7 March 1995) is a Czech professional ice hockey goaltender who is currently playing under contract with HC Škoda Plzeň of the Czech Extraliga (ELH). Svoboda was selected by the Edmonton Oilers in the 7th round (208th overall) of the 2015 NHL Entry Draft.

Playing career
Svoboda made his Czech Extraliga debut playing with HC Oceláři Třinec debut during the 2014–15 season. During the 2016–17 season, Svoboda played the entirety of the year on loan with second-tier club, HC Dukla Jihlava, backstopping the club to promotion back to the Extraliga. On 25 April 2017, Svoboda opted to leave Trinec for a starting role in agreeing to a two-year contract with HC Plzeň.

On 26 April 2018, he signed with the Nashville Predators of the National Hockey League (NHL). After attending the Predators training camp, Svoboda was reassigned to primary affiliate, the Milwaukee Admirals. With the logjam in the Admirals, Svoboda was reassigned to begin the 2018–19 with secondary ECHL affiliate, the Atlanta Gladiators. On 20 October 2018, he was recalled to the Nashville Predators to replace the injured Pekka Rinne. He was returned to the Admirals on 22 October 2018. Svoboda never made an appearance in the AHL, featuring in 14 games in the ECHL before opting to be placed on unconditional waivers by the Predators in order to mutually terminate his contract on 9 January 2019.

As a free agent, on 13 January 2019, Svoboda opted to play out the remainder of the season in Finland, joining top flight Liiga club, Tappara. Before making an appearance with Tappara, Svoboda was loaned to Mestis club, LeKi, on 18 January 2019. After 6 games he left his contract with Tappara, playing out the remainder of the season with Austrian club, Dornbirner EC of the Austrian Hockey League (EBEL).

On 5 March 2019, Svoboda decided to return for the following 2019–20 season to the Czech Extraliga, agreeing on a one-year contract with HC Vítkovice Ridera.

References

External links
 

1995 births
Living people
Atlanta Gladiators players
Czech ice hockey goaltenders
Dornbirn Bulldogs players
HC Dukla Jihlava players
Edmonton Oilers draft picks
Lempäälän Kisa players
HC Oceláři Třinec players
HC Plzeň players
HC Vítkovice players
People from Vsetín
Sportspeople from the Zlín Region
Czech expatriate ice hockey players in the United States
Czech expatriate ice hockey players in Finland
Czech expatriate sportspeople in Austria
Expatriate ice hockey players in Austria